The 1932–33 Greek Football Cup was the second edition of the Greek Football Cup. The competition culminated with the Greek Cup Final, replayed at Leoforos Alexandras Stadium, on 25 March 1933, because of the previous match (5 February) draw. The match was contested by Ethnikos Piraeus and Aris, with Ethnikos Piraeus winning by 2–1.

Calendar

First round

|}

Knockout phase
In the knockout phase, teams play against each other over a single match. If the match ends up as a draw, extra time will be played and if the match remains a draw at the end of the extra time a replay match is set. That procedure will be repeated until a winner occurs. There are no seedings, any teams can be drawn against each other.

Bracket

Second round

||colspan="2" rowspan="2" 

||colspan="2" rowspan="4" 

|}

Quarter-finals

|}

Semi-finals

|}

Final

The 2nd Greek Cup Final was played at the Aris Stadium and replayed at the Leoforos Alexandras Stadium.

Replay match

According to Greek FA's official site, there was only one match.

References

External links
Greek Cup 1932-33 at RSSSF

Greek Football Cup seasons
Greek Cup
1932–33 in Greek football